The Girl from the Third Row (Swedish: Flickan från tredje raden) is a 1949 Swedish comedy film directed by Hasse Ekman.

Plot
An extraordinary ring is being handed down amongst many people. They find it and lose it or give it away, but the ring always gives each owner good fortune or hope in some way. An angel watches over the ring and the people wearing it.

Cast
 Hasse Ekman as Sture Anker, theatre manager
 Eva Henning as the angel
 Hilda Borgström as Vilma Andersson
 Maj-Britt Nilsson as Birgit
 Sven Lindberg as Göte
 Gunnar Olsson as jeweller Lilja
 Sigge Fürst as Gusten Örjevall
 Siv Thulin as Sonja Örjevall
 Stig Olin as Kalle
 Ingrid Backlin as nurse Maj
 Gunnar Björnstrand as Edvin Burelius
 Hilding Gavle as Fredrik Antonsson
 Barbro Hiort af Ornäs as Dagmar Antonsson
 Francisca Lindberg as the little girl Charlotte, daughter of Birgit and Göte

External links

1949 films
Films directed by Hasse Ekman
1940s Swedish-language films
Swedish comedy films
1949 comedy films
Swedish black-and-white films
1940s Swedish films